Sylvia Elva Garcia (born 29 June 1987 in Chile), more commonly known under the stage name as Jena Lee, is a French singer, songwriter, composer.

Biography
Born in Chile, Sylvia Elva Garcia was adopted by a French family at the age of nine months. She grew up in Oloron-Sainte-Marie, Pyrénées-Atlantiques.

Music career

2007–2009: Popstars and Urban Music Nation
In 2007, Jena Lee met Sulee B Wax, who was interested in her work. When the fourth season of Popstars started, he asked Jena to try writing the instrumentals. Jena Lee wrote six songs of the thirteen that comprise Sheryfa Luna's album, including the song "Quelque part". Following the composition of these songs, she received other requests, such as from Mathieu Edward with the title "Comme avant" as well as for a composition for the musical theater show Cléopâtre.

In 2008, Lee won the Urban Music Nation contest organized by radio operator Skyrock; the finale was on 26 December 2008.

2009-2010: First released albums

Her first single, "J'aimerais tellement" ("I Would Really Love"), was released in April 2009 along with a music video. It was at the top of the French singles charts for a total of eleven weeks and had most downloads in November 2009.

Lee's first album, Vous remercier ("To Thank You"), was recorded with Bustafunk . It was released on 2 November 2009 on the Internet and to stores on 9 November 2009 on the label Mercury Records, a division of the group Universal Music France.

In 2010, Jena Lee released the follow up to Vous remercier, which contains the singles "US Boy", "Éternise-moi", the duet with French group Eskemo, and "Mon ange" ("My angel").

Artistry

Influences and musical style 

Jena Lee has defined her own musical style as "Emo R&B" or "Emotional R&B", having incorporate several musical genres such as R&B, Emo-pop, EDM, pop , Electropop , Electronic , Pop-rock , Dark-pop , Dance-Pop and Rock .  According to her, it is above all .

Controversy existed as to the relevance of this term at the time of its claim . The term "Emo R&B" would not correspond to "Emocore R&B" but to "Emotional R&B".

Discography

Albums

Singles

1 Digital downloads

References

External links
 Official website

1987 births
Living people
Chilean emigrants to France
French-language singers
21st-century French singers
21st-century French women singers
French women singer-songwriters
French singer-songwriters
Pop rock singers
French contemporary R&B singers
French sopranos
Dance-pop musicians
French pop singers
Alternative R&B musicians